Nagasaki Peace Park is a park located in Nagasaki, Japan, commemorating the atomic bombing of the city on August 9, 1945 during World War II. It is next to the Atomic Bomb Museum and near the Peace Memorial Hall.

History
Established in 1955, and near to the hypocenter of the explosion, remnants of a concrete wall of Urakami Cathedral can still be seen. Urakami Cathedral was the grandest church in east Asia at the time. At the park's north end is the 10-meter-tall Peace Statue created by sculptor Seibo Kitamura of Nagasaki Prefecture. The statue's right hand points to the threat of nuclear weapons while the extended left hand symbolizes eternal peace. The mild face symbolizes divine grace and the gently closed eyes offer a prayer for the repose of the bomb victims' souls. The folded right leg and extended left leg signify both meditation and the initiative to stand up and rescue the people of the world. The statue represents a mixture of western and eastern art, religion, and ideology. Installed in front of the statue is a black marble vault containing the names of the atomic bomb victims and survivors who died in subsequent years.

A plaque by the Peace Statue is titled Words from the Sculptor and reads:

Plaque

A plaque at the nearby hypocenter gives the following account and statistics of the damage caused that day.

(Large numbers of people have died in the following years from the effects of radioactive poisoning.)

Peace Memorial Ceremony

Every year, on 9 August, the anniversary of the atomic bombing, a Peace Memorial Ceremony is held in front of the statue and the Mayor of Nagasaki delivers a Peace Declaration to the World.

At the south end of the park is a "Fountain of Peace". This was constructed in August, 1969, as a prayer for the repose of the souls of the many atomic bomb victims who died searching for water, and as a dedication to world peace. Lines from a poem by a girl named Sachiko Yamaguchi, who was nine at the time of the bombing, are carved on a black stone plaque in front of the fountain. It reads: "I was thirsty beyond endurance. There was something oily on the surface of the water, but I wanted water so badly that I drank it just as it was."

Peace Symbols Zone
In 1978 the city of Nagasaki established a "Peace Symbols Zone" on both sides of the park and invited donations of monuments from countries round the world. The following monuments can be seen in the park:

 "Relief of Friendship" from Porto, Portugal (Nagasaki's sister city), 1978; the plaque reads: "Homage of the City of Porto to the Atomic Victims of the Sister city of Nagasaki--November 1978."
 "Joy of Life" from Czechoslovakia, (donated to Nagasaki in 1980). The bronze statue 260 cm in height was made by Czech sculptor Jan Hána (1927–1994) in 1975; the plaque reads: "It shows a jubilant mother lifting up her baby in her arms."
 "A Call" from Bulgaria, 1980; the plaque reads:"The sculpture symbolizes the struggle of youth in search of peace and harmony, showing a woman with her arms stretched up."
 "Monument of People's Friendship" from the former German Democratic Republic, 1981; the plaque reads: "The sculpture symbolizes the efforts for peace and a happy future of mankind, for the friendship among the peoples."
 "Protection of Our Future" from the city of Middelburg, The Netherlands (Nagasaki's sister city), 1983; the plaque reads: "The statue shows a mother protecting her infant child from danger, representing that we must protect not only the present generation but also the coming generation as well so that the people of the world can live in peace together."
 "Statue of Peace" from the former Union of Soviet Socialist Republics, 1985; the plaque reads: "It shows a mother holding her infant child as an expression of love and peace."
 "Maiden of Peace" from the People's Republic of China, 1985; the plaque reads: "It expresses the sincere aspiration of the Chinese people for human love and the everlasting friendship between Japan and the People's Republic of China."
 "Flower of Love and Peace" from Poland, 1986; the plaque reads: "Like a phoenix reborn from the ashes, like a flower grown out of stone, mankind affirms its existence when peace reigns over the Earth."
 "Hymn to Life" from the City of Pistoia, Italy, 1987; the plaque reads: "The statue, which depicts a mother holding her baby high in the air with both hands, is an expression of love and peace."
 "Sun Crane of Peace" from the Republic of Cuba, 1988; the plaque reads: "The faces of the atomic bomb victims contained within the sun form a paper crane and symbolize the vital importance of peace."
 "Monument of Peace" from Santos, Brazil (Nagasaki's sister city), 1988; the plaque reads: "It is preserved here as an expression of the aspiration for perpetual world peace embraced by the people of Brazil."
 "Infinity" from Ankara, Republic of Turkey, 1991; the plaque reads: "The figure of a man and woman joined hand in hand symbolize peace and harmony among the entire human race."
 "Constellation Earth" from St. Paul, Minnesota, USA (Nagasaki's sister city), 1992; the plaque reads: "The seven human figures represent continents. The interdependence of the figures symbolizes global peace and solidarity."
 "Triumph of Peace over War" from San Isidro, Argentina, 1996; the plaque reads: "The parts of the sculpture other than the red sphere symbolize the chaos and death of war, while the red sphere at the top signifies the ultimate triumph of life."
 "Cloak of Peace (Te Korowai Rangimarie)", by Kingsley Baird from New Zealand, 2006.; the plaque reads: "The statue symbolizes consolation, protection, and solidarity. It also expresses ambivalence, reflecting conflicting interpretations of historical events."
 "Tree of Life: Gift of Peace" (Punu Wankalpainya: Kalypa Nyinanytjaku) from Australia, unveiled 18 April 2016; the sculpture of a bronze tree cradling a ceremonial piti (dish) originates in the Anangu communities of Yalata and Oak Valley/Maralinga in South Australia. The plaques which are in Pitjantjatjara, Japanese and English, read "The tree gives life to make the piti (dish) that is used for carrying food, water, and babies. It represents the sharing of resources between families, communities and nations for peace and harmony." The sculpture also recognises atomic survivors worldwide.
Monument to Commemorate Chinese Victims of the Atomic Bombing
Monument for Korean Atomic Victims
The Monument for Korean Atomic Victims is located in Nagasaki Peace Park in Nagasaki, Japan.  At the time of the atomic bombing in Nagasaki, there were many people of nationalities other than Japanese that were living in the area.  There were an estimated 12,000 to 14,000 Koreans living in Nagasaki during the bombing.  It is believed that up to 2,000 of them died because of the atomic bomb. At the time, many of those Koreans were being used as forced labor as a part of the Japanese war effort. This monument commemorates the Korean victims and serves as a message asking for peace in the world, an abolition of nuclear weapons, and a peaceful reunification of the Korean nation.  The Monument for Korean Atomic Victims was unveiled on August 9, 1979.

Photos

References

Monuments and memorials concerning the atomic bombings of Hiroshima and Nagasaki
Monuments and memorials in Japan
Parks and gardens in Nagasaki
Peace parks
Atomic tourism